Cossulus nycteris is a moth in the family Cossidae. It is found in Uzbekistan.

References

Natural History Museum Lepidoptera generic names catalog

Moths described in 1923
Cossinae
Moths of Asia